To Separate the Flesh from the Bones were a Finnish deathgrind band. The band can be considered a side project of three members of Finland's metal and rock scenes: Pasi Koskinen (ex-Amorphis, ex-Shape of Despair, Ajattara), Mika Karppinen (ex-HIM) and Niclas Etelävuori (ex-Amorphis, ex-Moonspell).

Biography 
The project began circa 2004 when three active members of Finland's metal scene decided to create a grindcore and brutal death side project. Pasi Koskinen and Niclas Etelävuori, ex-bandmates from Amorphis, joined Mika Karppinen (aka Gas) who is in the gothic rock band HIM.

Though the band members are not anonymous, they want to keep their identities hidden by covering their faces in promo pictures and live concerts and by using pseudonyms instead of their real names: Herr Arschstein (Pasi Koskinen), Rot Wailer (Niclas Etelävuori) and Pus Sypope (Mika "Gas" Karppinen).

The band released their first EP in 2004, For Those About to Rot (a play on AC/DC's For Those About to Rock We Salute You).

In November 2004, Spinefarm Records released the band's first album, Utopia Sadistica. The musical aesthetics are the same and Carcass' Jeff Walker makes a guest appearance on the album.

Members 
Herr Arschstein – vocals, guitar
Rot Wailer (Niclas Etelävuori) – bass
Pus Sypope – drums

Discography 
For Those About to Rot (EP, 2004)
Utopia Sadistica (album, Spinefarm, 2004)

External links 
 

Musical groups established in 2004
Finnish musical trios
Masked musicians
Finnish death metal musical groups
Goregrind musical groups